Bart Arens (born 2 March 1978) is a Dutch radio DJ. He currently presents 3 radio programs on 3FM: 3FM Weekend Request, Mega Top 50 and De radioshow van Bart.

References

1978 births
Living people
Dutch radio personalities